Miss Venezuela 1998 was the 45th Miss Venezuela pageant, was held in Caracas, Venezuela, on September 11, 1998, after weeks of events. The winner of the pageant was Carolina Indriago, Miss Delta Amacuro.

The pageant was broadcast live on Venevision from the Poliedro de Caracas in Caracas, Venezuela. At the conclusion of the final night of competition, outgoing titleholder Veruska Ramírez crowned Carolina Indriago as the new Miss Venezuela. 30 delegates competed for the crown.

Results

Special awards
 Miss Photogenic (voted by press reporters) - Verónica Schneider (Miss Monagas)
 Miss Internet (voted by www.missvenezuela.com viewers) - Mayela Mora (Miss Aragua)
 Miss Congeniality (voted by Miss Venezuela contestants) - Elsy Barrios (Miss Trujillo)
 Miss Figure - Carolina Indriago (Miss Delta Amacuro)
 Best Hair - Johanna Grimaldo (Miss Táchira)
 Best Smile - Verónica Schneider (Miss Monagas)
 Most beautiful Eyes - Daira Lambis (Miss Península de Paraguaná)
 Best Skin - Bárbara Pérez (Miss Miranda)
 Miss Elegance - Carolina Indriago (Miss Delta Amacuro)
 Best Legs - Ana Carolina Butragueño (Miss Portuguesa)

Delegates
The Miss Venezuela 1998 delegates are:

Notes
 Carolina Indriago was placed as 3rd runner-up in Miss Universe 1999 in Chaguaramas, Trinidad and Tobago.
 Veronica Schneider was unplaced at Miss World 1998 in Seychelles. Later, she became a successful soap opera actress.
 Barbara Perez never made it to Miss International. By the time she had to compete, the 1999 Miss Venezuela pageant had already taken place. Andreina Llamozas was sent instead.
 Daira Lambis won Reinado Internacional del Café 1999 in Manizales, Colombia. She was also placed as 1st runner-up in Reina Sudamericana 1998 in Santa Cruz, Bolivia.
 Angie Perez (Barinas) and Johanna Grimaldo (Tachira) competed in the 2000 pageant "Miss Republica Bolivariana de Venezuela".

External links
Miss Venezuela official website

1998 beauty pageants
1998 in Venezuela